Poison of Ages is an album by New Zealand metal band 8 Foot Sativa. The official release date was May 21, 2007.

A two-minute demo of 'For the Birds' could be found on their website 8footsativa.com. The band premiered 'For the Birds' in August 2006 at The Rack and Ruin bar in Napier. They also premiered 'Thumbs, Eye Sockets, Love' not long afterwards. The band played at least three of the songs live before they released Poison of Ages.

Recording
8 Foot Sativa's drummer at the time, Corey Friedlander, was planned to play the drums for this album but was unable to perform to the standard required of the album's producer. Steven Westerberg from Carnal Forge ended up doing the drumming on this album.  Petri Kuusisto, also from Carnal Forge, performed the guitar solos on the songs Crosses For Eyes and For The Birds.

On the Official Forums Ben Read, the lead vocalist, stated that due to a breached contract Poison of Ages would not be able to be released until the band put together NZD $20,000. He however promised that the album would be released at some stage.

Track listing

 Emancipate – 3:26
 Thumbs, Eye-Sockets, Love – 4:36
 We, the Termites – 3:20
 Exeunt – 4:43
 Crosses for Eyes – 4:48
 Pirates & Capitalists – 6:06
 The Great Western Cliff-Hanger – 4:55
 For the Birds – 4:29
 Napalm Existence – 5:13

Credits
Ben Read - Vocals
Gary Smith - Guitar
William Cleverdon - Guitar
Brent Fox - Bass
Steven Westerberg - Drums

References

2007 albums
8 Foot Sativa albums